The Dissociatives is the sole album by the Australian duo of the same name, released in April 2004 by record label Eleven. It peaked at No. 12 on the ARIA Albums Chart. Three singles were issued from the album, "Somewhere Down the Barrel" (March 2004), "Young Man, Old Man (You Ain't Better Than the Rest)" (May) and "Horror with Eyeballs". At the ARIA Music Awards of 2004 they won Best Video for "Somewhere Down the Barrel", directed by James Hackett and Best Cover Art for the album, also by Hackett.

Background 

Daniel Johns (of Silverchair) and Australian dance music producer, Paul Mac, met when Mac remixed Silverchair's song "Freak" off the Freak Show album. The two worked on an experimental extended play, I Can't Believe It's Not Rock, released in 2000.

Recording and production 

In mid-2003 Johns and Mac collaborated to record an album, The Dissociatives, starting with basic tracks in London and finishing off in Sydney and Newcastle. The pair provided all the instrumental tracks and vocals themselves with Johns writing the lyrics and recording them in Newcastle.

The duo described the music and lyrics in the April 2004 Australian edition of Rolling Stone, "The music is, for me, a combination of excitement, happiness, rambunctiousness and vicaciousness, done to whimsy," Johns said. "I'd add with a hint of melancholy, but it's more outweighed by joy," added Mac. The magazine's writer described the sound of the debut single, "Somewhere Down the Barrel", as a "happy sort of Radiohead."

Release and reception 

The Dissociatives was released on 4 April 2004, by record label, Eleven. It was fitted with the Copy Control protection system in some regions. "Somewhere Down the Barrel", their first single, entered the ARIA Singles Chart on debut at No. 25 on 15 March 2004. It was one of the five most played tracks on Australian radio in early March of that year. Given that Silverchair sold more albums in Australia in the 1990s than any other Australian artist, the debut album by the Dissociatives was expected to be one of the best selling ones when it was released on 5 April in that country. It debuted and peaked at No. 12 on the ARIA Albums Chart.

Reception 

The Dissociatives has received a generally positive critical reception. A negative review came from Pitchfork, which wrote, "Leftfield techno vet Paul Mac seems stale working away from a club-oriented context, but it's Johns who seems out of his depth. Maybe he can write a three-chord rock song, but here he under-sings, over-emotes, and writes melodies that spiral off in insane directions before ending up nowhere".

Track listing

All music written by Daniel Johns and Paul Mac; all lyrics written by Johns.

"We're Much Preferred Customers" – 5:46
"Somewhere Down the Barrel" – 4:39
"Horror with Eyeballs" – 4:45
"Lifting the Veil from the Braille" – 4:18
"Forever and a Day" – 4:49
"Thinking in Reverse" – 3:41
"Paris Circa 2007slash08" – 3:52
"Young Man, Old Man (You Ain't Better Than the Rest)" – 4:31
"Aaängry Megaphone Man" – 4:52
"Sleep Well Tonight" – 2:29
"Paris Circa 2007slash08" (Hermitude Remix) (Japan bonus track)

Release history

The album was released in various countries.

References

External links
 

ARIA Award-winning albums
The Dissociatives albums
2004 debut albums
Astralwerks albums
Eleven: A Music Company albums
Virgin Records albums